Curtitoma bartschi is a species of sea snail, a marine gastropod mollusk in the family Mangeliidae.

Description
The length of the shell varies between 5 mm and 10 mm.

Distribution
This marine species occurs off Japan and Urup Island, Eastern Russia

References

 Bogdanov, I.P. (1985) New species of gastropod molluscs of the genus Oenopota (Gastropoda, Turridae) from Far Eastern seas of the USSR. Zoological Journal, 64 (3) : 448–453.

External links
  Tucker, J.K. 2004 Catalog of recent and fossil turrids (Mollusca: Gastropoda). Zootaxa 682:1–1295.

bartschi